Thirukolakka Sapthapureeswarar Temple (திருக்கோலக்கா சப்தபுரீசுவரர் கோயில்) is a Hindu temple located at Keezhai Thirukolakka in Mayiladuthurai district of Tamil Nadu, India. The historical name of the place is  Sapthapuri.  The presiding deity is Shiva. He is called as Sapthapureeswarar. His consort is known as  Osai Kodutha Nayaki.

Significance 
It is one of the shrines of the 275 Paadal Petra Sthalams - Shiva Sthalams glorified in the early medieval Tevaram poems by Tamil Saivite Nayanars Tirugnanasambandar and Sundarar. Saint Sambandar is believed to have obtained a golden cymbal miraculously in this temple.

Literary Mention 
Tirugnanasambandar describes the feature of the deity as:

References

External links 
 
 

Shiva temples in Mayiladuthurai district
Padal Petra Stalam